= Le Cuir =

Newspaper published from Paris, France

- Type: Daily
- Editor-in-chief: Charles Guénot (1930s)
- Founded: 1908
- Language: French language
- Headquarters: 54, rue de Bondy, Paris 48°52′7.8″N 2°21′33.7″E

Le Cuir ('Leather') was a daily newspaper published from Paris, France, founded in 1908. Le Cuir was dedicated to covering issues relating to the leather/shoe industry and trade. As of the mid-1930s, U-J Thuau was the director of the newspaper and Charles Guénot its editor-in-chief.
